Tobias-Pascal Schultz (*25 June 1995) is a German sprint canoeist.

Career
He won a medal at the 2019 ICF Canoe Sprint World Championships.

Life
Tobias-Pascal Schultz is studying mathematics and sports at the University of Wuppertal. He lives and trains in Essen, together with other canoeists like Max Hoff or Max Rendschmidt. His Grandfather is Karl-Heinz Weißenfels.

References

External links

1995 births
Living people
German male canoeists
ICF Canoe Sprint World Championships medalists in kayak
Sportspeople from Essen